Cyrus Macmillan,  (September 12, 1882 – June 29, 1953) was a Canadian academic, writer and politician.

Born in Wood Islands, Prince Edward Island, he received a Bachelor of Arts degree in 1900 and a Master of Arts degree in 1903 from McGill University. He received a Ph.D. from Harvard University in 1909 and started as a lecturer at McGill. During World War I, he served with the 7th Canadian Siege Battery. After the war, he became an Associate Professor and in 1923 was appointed Chairman of the English department. From 1940 to 1947, he was the Dean of the Faculty of Arts and Science.

In June 1930, he was appointed Minister of Fisheries in the cabinet of Liberal Prime Minister Mackenzie King. He was defeated in July's 1930 federal election in the Prince Edward Island riding of Queen's. In 1940, he was elected to the House of Commons of Canada in the riding of Queen's. He was defeated in 1945. From 1943 to 1946, he was the Parliamentary Assistant to the Minister of National Defence for Air.

He is the author of McGill and Its Story, 1821-1921 (1921), Canadian Wonder Tales (1918) and Canadian Fairy Tales (1922)

References

External links
 
 
 
 
 
 
 

1882 births
1953 deaths
People from Queens County, Prince Edward Island
Canadian folklorists
Canadian male non-fiction writers
Canadian university and college faculty deans
Harvard University alumni
Liberal Party of Canada MPs
McGill University alumni
Academic staff of McGill University
Members of the House of Commons of Canada from Prince Edward Island
Members of the King's Privy Council for Canada
Writers from Prince Edward Island
20th-century Canadian historians